The Federal Economic Competition Commission (Spanish: Comisión Federal de Competencia Económica, Cofece) is the chief competition regulatory agency in Mexico. Known as the Federal Competition Commission (Comisión Federal de Competencia, CFC) prior to 2013, the commission functions under the portfolio of the Secretariat of Economy.

History 
The commission was established in 1993. Under Article 28 of the Mexican Constitution, it is responsible for:"...overseeing, promoting and guaranteeing competition and market access in Mexico for the efficient functioning of markets to the benefit of consumers and implementation of the Federal Economic Competition Law (LFCE)".The commission is headed by five commissioners appointed by the President of Mexico, each of whom serves 10-year terms; one of the five members serves as president of the commission. Additionally, Cofece employs 175 other people, including 41 support staff.

The mission of the CFC is to "protect the process of competition and free access to markets, through the prevention and elimination of monopolistic practices and other restrictions to market efficiency, in order to contribute to societal welfare." Functions of the CFC include approval of mergers and acquisitions, investigating and penalizing monopolistic conduct, authorizing business activities in regulated sectors, and advocacy for competition in the marketplace. Article 28 of Mexico's constitution prohibits monopolies, but a more complete competition policy was set out in the LFCE (1993).

References

Official site of the Comisión Federal de Competencia (English version)

External links
Resolutions of the CFC (English version)

Government agencies of Mexico
Competition regulators
Consumer organizations in Mexico
Regulation in Mexico